Mohavea is a plant genus consisting of two species native to the deserts of the southwestern United States and northern Mexico. This genus is often included in the closely related snapdragon genus Antirrhinum.

Taxonomy 
Formerly included in the family Scrophulariaceae, the genus is now included in Plantaginaceae. The two species are both notable annuals flowering in the spring: the lesser mohavea, Mohavea breviflora, has small yellow flowers, while the ghost flower, Mohavea confertiflora, features large pale flowers with a pattern of purple spots.

Etymology 
The genus name is derived from the Mojave River, where specimens were first collected by John C. Fremont.

References

External links
USDA Plants Profile for Mohavea

Plantaginaceae
Plantaginaceae genera
Flora of the California desert regions
Natural history of the Mojave Desert
Taxa named by Asa Gray